Mandragora turcomanica, the Turkmenian mandrake, is a perennial herbaceous plant in the family Solanaceae, native to the Kopet Dag mountains in Turkmenistan and one location in neighbouring Iran. It differs from the mandrakes found around the Mediterranean (Mandragora autumnalis and/or Mandragora officinarum) chiefly by being larger.

Description
Mandragora turcomanica is a perennial herbaceous plant with a thick, often branched tap-root. It has little or no stem, the leaves being arranged in a basal rosette. The lower leaves are usually irregularly toothed towards the end, the upper leaves being entire. Both sides of the leaves have scattered hairs, mainly along the veins.

Flowering time is autumn to early spring (October to March) in Turkmenistan, late winter to early spring (February to March) in Iran. The five sepals are fused at the base to form a bell-shaped cup, lobed to about two thirds of its length of  when in flower, lengthening in fruit. The stamens are included within the flower, joined to the fused petals at the base. The anthers are pale blue.

Taxonomy
Mandragora turcomanica was first described in 1942 by Olga F. Mizgireva (Ольга Фоминична Мизгирёва), a Turkmenian botanist and former artist. Mizgireva differentiated M. turcomanica from the Mediterranean mandrakes chiefly by the size of the plant (M. turcomanica is larger), the colour of the anthers and the relative sizes of the calyx and corolla.

Ungricht et al. in their 1998 revision of the genus Mandragora retained M. turcomanica as a separate species, although they were not able to examine either any herbarium specimens or any live plants. They said that further study was needed to compare the ranges of variation of this species and their concept of Mandragora officinarum. In 2003, Akhani and Ghorbani reported the occurrence of M. turcomanica in Iran. They considered that it was sufficiently similar to the Mediterranean species that the rank of subspecies rather than species might be appropriate, although further study was needed. A 2010 molecular phylogenetic study placed M. turcomanica in a clade with the authors' concept of Mandragora autumnalis.

Distribution and habitat
Mandragora turcomanica was first discovered in the south-western Kopet Dag mountains in Turkmenistan. Ungricht et al. queried whether it might also occur in the same mountain chain across the border in Iran. It was reported in Iran in 2003, near the village of Dahaneh close to the Golestan National Park. It was growing in gardens, where it had been transplanted from wild sources.

Conservation
Mandragora turcomanica was reported to be "on the verge of extinction" in Turkmenistan in 2001. There were said to be fewer than 500 plants in their natural habitats in Turkmenistan in 1999. Only about 50 plants were in cultivation in the sole Iranian location in 2010.

Toxicity and uses
All the species of Mandragora are described as toxic and to have had traditional medicinal uses. Mizgireva is reported to have said in 1942 that it was used by the local people in Turkmenistan as a medicinal plant. In Iran, the discoverers of M. turcomanica described it as an "old medicinal and mythically important plant" but said that they were unable to discover earlier local uses.

At the beginning of the growth cycle, the leaves of M. turcomanica contained 0.3% of alkaloids; later the roots contained 0.2%. By contrast the unripe fruits contained only 0.07% and the ripe seeds only 0.03%. The main alkaloids were the tropane alkaloids scopolamine (hyoscine), apohyoscine and hyoscyamine; others detected included belladonnine, norhyoscyamine, apoatropine, 3α-trigloyloxytropan-6β-ol and tigloidine. Tropane alkaloids are potentially highly toxic. A wide range of lipids and lipid-like compounds were also identified.

References

Plants described in 1942
Solanoideae